Johny El Zein (born 24 March 1992), simply known as Zein, is a professional footballer who currently plays as a winger for Aris Limassol FC. Born in the United Arab Emirates, El Zein represents Belize internationally.

Club career 
Zein was born in Dubai, UAE played previously for Ethnikos Achna FC. Officials announced on 2 February 2018, Zein was eligible to play against Apoel FC just days after the signing. Zein made his professional debut with Ethnikos Achna FC against Doxa Katokopias FC coming on as a substitute.

Aris FC 
In August 2019 announcement was made that the versatile winger signed for the season 2019/2020 with Aris FC. He made his league Debut coming off the bench on the 54th minute and scoring one goal with a good clinical finish. On Aris FC victory against Omonia Aradippou, Zein helped coming off the bench to keep the lead. The Limassol team are now 1st place of the first group.

International career
El Zein was born in the United Arab Emirates to a Belizean Arab father and Cypriot mother. He was called up to represent the Belize national team in March 2021.

Personal life 
Zein has made contributions alongside his teammates at Enosis Neon Paralimni to a charitable event, which aims to raise money for children with special needs.

References

External links 
J.El Zein  at Soccerway.
J.El Zein  at Footbl.com

1992 births
Sportspeople from Dubai
Living people
Belizean footballers
Belizean people of Greek Cypriot descent
Association football midfielders
Ethnikos Achna FC players
Enosis Neon Paralimni FC players
Cypriot First Division players